Fire Station No. 23 may refer to:

 Fire Station No. 23 (Los Angeles, California), listed on the NRHP in California
 Fire Station No. 23 (Seattle, Washington), listed on the NRHP in Washington

See also
List of fire stations